The term space sphere refers to a space habitat shaped like a sphere. Types include:

Bernal sphere
Dyson sphere

See also
Space cylinder